Édifice Ernest-Cormier was the second courthouse in Montreal to bear the name Palais de justice de Montréal. It was built between 1922 and 1926, and designed by architects , Charles Jewett Saxe and Ernest Cormier. It was the first major commission for Cormier after his return to Montreal from his studies in Paris. After Cormier's death in 1980, the building was renamed in his honour. It currently houses the Quebec Court of Appeal.

It is located at 100 Notre-Dame Street East, across the street from both the first Palais de justice de Montréal, Édifice Lucien-Saulnier, and the current courthouse.

References

Government buildings completed in 1926
Courthouses in Canada
Old Montreal
Ernest Cormier buildings
Beaux-Arts architecture in Canada
Former courthouses
Quebec government buildings
Heritage buildings of Quebec